Ghana–Mexico relations are the diplomatic relations between the Republic of Ghana and the United Mexican States. Both nations are members of the United Nations.

History
In March 1957, Ghana obtained its independence from the United Kingdom, becoming the first African nation to do so. On 8 August 1961 Mexico became the first country in Latin America to recognize and establish diplomatic relations with Ghana. In 1961, Mexican President Adolfo López Mateos sent a presidential delegation of goodwill, led by Special Envoy Alejandro Carrillo Marcor and Delegate José Ezequiel Iturriaga, to visit Ghana. In 1965 Mexico opened an embassy in Accra, and Ghana followed suit by opening an embassy in Mexico City. In 1972, Mexico closed its embassy in Accra due to budgetary reasons. In 1980, Ghana closed its embassy in Mexico City.

In December 2009, Ghanaian Foreign Minister Muhammad Mumuni paid an official visit to Mexico, becoming the highest-ranking Ghanaian official to do so. In May 2011, Mexican Foreign Minister Patricia Espinosa Cantellano met with Ghanaian Foreign Minister Muhammad Mumuni during the Conference on Global Governance and the Reform of the Security Council of the United Nations in Rome. Both officials reviewed the status of the bilateral relationship and discussed multilateral issues such as the reform of the Security Council and follow-up of the Cancun Agreements on climate change.

In 2013, Mexico announced the re-opening of an embassy in Accra, sharing the embassy premises with members of the Pacific Alliance (which includes Chile, Colombia and Peru). In 2016, both nations agreed on a Memorandum of Understanding between the Ghana Investment Promotion Centre and ProMéxico. In December 2018, Foreign Deputy Minister Charles Owiredu arrived in Mexico City to attend the inauguration for Mexican President Andrés Manuel López Obrador.

In August 2019, Mexican Foreign Undersecretary Julián Ventura Valero paid a visit to Ghana and met with Foreign Deputy Minister Charles Owiredu. Both nations agreed to establish a Consultation Mechanism on Common Interests. Ghana also declared its intention to re-open an embassy in Mexico City.

High-level visits

High-level visits from Ghana to Mexico
 Foreign Minister Muhammad Mumuni (2009)
 Minister of Trade Alan John Kyerematen (2017)
 Foreign Deputy Minister Charles Owiredu (2018)

High-level visits from Mexico to Ghana
 Special Envoy Alejandro Carrillo Marcor (1961)
 Delegate José Ezequiel Iturriaga (1961)
 Director General for ProMéxico Francisco González Díaz (2016)
 Foreign Director General for Africa and the Middle East Jorge Álvarez Fuentes (2018)
 Foreign Undersecretary Julián Ventura Valero (2019)

Trade
In 2018, trade between Ghana and Mexico totalled US$16.1 million. Ghana's main exports to Mexico include: cocoa beans, cocoa oil, cocoa powder, screws, sports shirts, fixing straps or clamps and transmission belts. Mexico's main exports to Ghana include: smart cards, household items, toys, tequila and other alcohols; motors for elevators, generators, memory units, and surgical suture material. Mexican company Agrícola Gotsis invests in Ghana.

Diplomatic missions
 Ghana is accredited to Mexico from its embassy in Washington, D.C., United States.
 Mexico has an embassy in Accra.

See also  
 Foreign relations of Ghana
 Foreign relations of Mexico

References 

 
Mexico
Ghana